Guerra de Sexos (2012) (Spanish for "Battle of the Sexes") was the second annual Guerra de Sexos professional wrestling event produced by the International Wrestling Revolution Group. It took place on February 5, 2012, at Arena Naucalpan in Naucalpan, State of Mexico. The event title refers to the main event match, a steel cage match that featured male wrestlers, female wrestlers, Exótico wrestlers and Mini-Estrellas all competing against each other. The last person in the cage would be forced to either remove their wrestling mask, or if already unmask have their hair shaved off. The Under card featured two wrestlers from Asistencia Asesoria y Administracion (AAA), El Texano, Jr. and Toscano, who appeared due to IWRG's working relationship with AAA.

Production

Background
Starting as far back as at least 2000, the Mexican wrestling promotion  International Wrestling Revolution Group (IWRG; Sometimes referred to as Grupo Internacional Revolución in Spanish) has held several annual events where the main event was a multi-man steel cage match where the last wrestler left in the cage would be forced to either remove their wrestling mask or have their hair shaved off under Lucha de Apuestas, or "bet match", rules. Starting in 2011 IWRG began holding a special version of the steel cage match concept under the name Guerra de Sexos, or "War of the Sexes", as they held a show centered on an inter-gender steel cage match main event that saw men and women fight each other with their mask or hair on the line. At times IWRG also included Mini-Estrella competitors and Exótico wrestlers in the cage as well. The inter-gender aspects of the show distinguishes the Guerra de Sexos events from  other Steel cage matches held throughout the year such as the IWRG El Castillo del Terror ("The Tower of Terror"), IWRG Guerra del Golfo ("Gulf War") or IWRG Prison Fatal ("Deadly Prison") shows. The Guerra de Sexos shows, as well as the majority of the IWRG shows in general, are held in "Arena Naucalpan", owned by the promoters of IWRG and their main arena. The 2011 Guerra de Sexos show was the first year IWRG promoted a show under that name.

Storylines
The event featured four professional wrestling matches with different wrestlers involved in pre-existing scripted feuds, plots and storylines. Wrestlers were portrayed as either heels (referred to as rudos in Mexico, those that portray the "bad guys") or faces (técnicos in Mexico, the "good guy" characters) as they followed a series of tension-building events, which culminated in a wrestling match or series of matches.

Results 

Order of escape
Ludark Shaitan
Chucky
Sexy Lady
Bracito de Oro
Oficial AK-47
Miss Gaviota
Angélico
Veneno
Super Nova
Mosco X-Fly
Tony Rivera

References

External links 
IWRG Official Website

2012 in professional wrestling
2012 in Mexico
2012
February 2012 events in Mexico